HMS Hastings was a 74-gun third rate ship of the line of the Royal Navy. She was built in Calcutta for the Honourable East India Company, but the Royal Navy purchased her in 1819. The Navy sold her in 1886.

East India Company
Hastings was built of the highest quality "saul", "sissoo", "Pegue", and "Java" teak wood, following Sir Robert Seppings's principles, which resulted in a vessel both longitudinal and transverse support. Her construction cost sicca rupees (Sa.Rs.) 8,71,406 (£108,938), which the merchants of Calcutta and other patriotic individuals subscribed via shares. The full cost of getting her ready for sea was Sa.Rs. 8,71,406 (£116,375).

Captain John Hayes sailed Hastings from Calcutta on 28 March 1818. She reached Madras on 13 April, and Port Louis on 2 July. From there she reached St Helena on 15 September, and arrived at The Downs on 3 November.

HMS Hastings

The Admiralty purchased Hastings on 22 June 1819. It paid about half of what the vessel had cost the shareholders in Calcutta that had subscribed to her construction. The belief in Calcutta was that the jealousy of the Thames shipbuilders led to the undervaluation of the ship.

In 1838 'the ship
 took the new governor, Lord John Lambton, 1st Earl of Durham, to Canada. The ship arrived in Quebec on 27 May 1838.

Sailors and marines from Hastings fought Chinese pirates at the Battle of Tonkin River in 20–22 October 1849.

In 1855 she was fitted with screw propulsion. In 1857 the ship was deployed to Liverpool on coastal defence duties before being transferred to the Royal Naval Reserve to be used as a training ship.

FateHastings was sold out of the navy in 1886
.

Notes, citations and references
Notes

Citations

References
Lavery, Brian (2003) The Ship of the Line - Volume 1: The development of the battlefleet 1650-1850. Conway Maritime Press. .
Lee, Ida (1912) Commodore Sir John Hayes: His Voyage and Life (1767-1831) with Some Account of Admiral D'Entrecasteaux's Voyage of 1792-3. (Longmans, Green). 
Phipps, John Phipps (of the Master Attendant's Office, Calcutta) (1840) A Collection of Papers Relative to Ship Building in India ...: Also a Register Comprehending All the Ships ... Built in India to the Present Time ...''. (Scott). (Google eBook)

Ships of the line of the Royal Navy
Ships of the British East India Company
British ships built in India
Coal hulks